The 2014 São Paulo Sevens is the inaugural São Paulo Sevens tournament, and the third of six tournaments in the 2013–14 IRB Women's Sevens World Series.  It was held on February 21 and 22 at Arena Barueri, São Paulo.

Format 

The teams were drawn into three pools of four teams each. Each team played everyone in their pool one time. The top two teams from each pool advanced to the Cup/Plate brackets while the top 2 third place teams competed in the Cup/Plate. The rest of the teams from each group went to the Bowl brackets.

Teams 

A total of twelve teams will compete: The nine "core" teams, and three invited teams.

Core Teams

Invited Teams

Pool Stage

Pool A

Pool B

Pool C

Knockout stage

Bowl

Plate

Cup

References

External links
Official website

2013–14 IRB Women's Sevens World Series
São Paulo Sevens
2014 in women's rugby union
2014 rugby sevens competitions
2014 in Brazilian sport